Walker Rannie Davidson (1808 – 20 November 1876) was a Surveyor General of New South Wales, (then a colony, now a state of Australia)


Early life
Davidson was born in Perthshire, Scotland and arrived in Australia around 1829.

Career in Australia
Davidson was Surveyor General of New South Wales 1862 to 1868, succeeding Alexander Grant McLean. Davidson was succeeded by Philip Francis Adams as Surveyor General.

External links
Map of New South Wales, 1865 author:Davidson, W. R — National Library of Australia.

References 

1808 births
1876 deaths
Surveyors General of New South Wales
Australian surveyors
People from Perth, Scotland
Scottish emigrants to colonial Australia
19th-century Australian politicians